The Zerotracer is a purpose built Electric vehicle for the Zero Emissions Race which went around the world in 2010/11. The vehicle seats two in a closed cabin, while its driving characteristics are more similar to a motorbike. The race started under UNEP patronage on 16 August 2010 in front of the Palace of Nations at Geneva where it ended on 24 February 2011 completing 80 days of travel – inspired by Jules Verne's novel, Around the World in Eighty Days. 
Of the only three vehicles completing the race, Zerotracer accumulated the highest score of points to win.

Zero Emission Race Route
Geneva – Bruxelles – Berlin – Kyiv – Moscow – Chelyabinsk – Almaty – Ürümqi – Shanghai – Vancouver – US West Coast – Cancún 2010 United Nations Climate Change Conference – Casablanca – Geneva.

Performance and development 
Zerotracer covered the through route from Geneva to Shanghai without any breaks caused by technical problems.  
This is due to its fully developed concept deriving from the Monotracer, a very similar concept using a petrol engine. Manufacturer Designwerk is considering commercial production of the vehicle.

References 

Electric motorcycles
Green vehicles
Environmentalism